The Mobile Legends: Bang Bang tournament for the 2019 Southeast Asian Games were held on December 5 to 8 at the Filoil Flying V Centre in San Juan, Metro Manila.

The tournament consisted of a group stage and a two-bracket playoff round.

The Philippines clinched the gold medal, winning over Indonesia in the grand finals.

Participating teams
Nine teams from nine nations participated at the Mobile Legends: Bang Bang tournament of the 2019 Southeast Asian Games.

Results

Group stage

Group A

Source:One Esport

Group B

Source:One Esport

Final round
All playoff games including the Bronze Medal Match were a  series, except for the Gold Medal Match were a  series.

Lower Bracket
Semifinals

Finals – Bronze medal

Upper Bracket
Finals

Gold medal

References

2019 in Philippine sport
2019 in esports
2019 multiplayer online battle arena tournaments
Mobile Legends
Mobile Legends: Bang Bang competitions